Thysanocrepis crossota is a moth of the family Tortricidae. It is found in Thailand, the Solomon Islands, New Guinea and Vietnam. Records for Australia represent a misidentification.

References

Moths described in 1911
Olethreutini